Winnica  is a village in the administrative district of Gmina Połaniec, within Staszów County, Świętokrzyskie Voivodeship, in south-central Poland.

The village has a population of  136.

Demography 
According to the 2002 Poland census, there were 118 people residing in Winnica village, of whom 52.5% were male and 47.5% were female. In the village, the population was spread out, with 26.3% under the age of 18, 36.4% from 18 to 44, 20.3% from 45 to 64, and 16.9% who were 65 years of age or older.
 Figure 1. Population pyramid of village in 2002 — by age group and sex

References

Villages in Staszów County